Edwin Thomas Thacker (24 July 1913 – 4 August 1974) was a South African athlete who competed in the 1936 Summer Olympics.

He was born in Germiston.

In 1936 he finished twelfth in the Olympic high jump event.

At the 1934 Empire Games he won the gold medal high jump competition. Four years later at the 1938 Empire Games he won the gold medal in the high jump contest again.

External links

1913 births
1974 deaths
Sportspeople from Germiston
South African male high jumpers
Olympic athletes of South Africa
Athletes (track and field) at the 1936 Summer Olympics
Athletes (track and field) at the 1934 British Empire Games
Athletes (track and field) at the 1938 British Empire Games
Commonwealth Games gold medallists for South Africa
Commonwealth Games medallists in athletics
Medallists at the 1934 British Empire Games
Medallists at the 1938 British Empire Games